Bibliography of Rasul Jafarian is a list of books published by Rasul Jafarian (born 1964), cleric, translator, writer and researcher of Iranian history.

Jafarian is an Iranian prolific writer and has many works in the science of history. He started writing in 1985 with a book entitled An Introduction to the History of Islam. He has authored more than 90 books, some of which are in large numbers; for example, his book entitled Historical essays has been republished in more than 20 volumes.

Jafarian's works also succeeded in gaining honors; for example, the book Atlas of Shia was selected for Iran's Book of the Year Awards and won the Jalal Al-e Ahmad Literary Awards and the Farabi International Award. What makes his work even more important is the translation of his books into other languages such as English, Arabic and Urdu.

Some of his works are among the academic course resources and the resources of master and doctorate in history field.

Jafarian's main research is on the history of Shiism, but he has also done a lot of research in fields such as the political history of the beginning of Islam and the history of the Safavid period. He has also published numerous researches and articles on the history of Iranian pilgrimage to Hajj.

Works
Jafarian's works are divided into three general sections:

 Books
 Travelogues
 Translations

Books

* All books are in Persian and their titles have been translated for convenience.

Travelogues

* All books are in Persian and their titles have been translated for convenience.

Translations

* All books are in Persian and their titles have been translated for convenience.

See also
 Morteza Motahhari bibliography

References

External links
Rasul Jafarian books on Adinehbook
Rasul Jafarian books on Gisoom
Rasul Jafarian – Google Scholar
Rasul Jafarian articles in English on SID
Rasul Jafarian English articles on Magiran
Rasul Jafarian English articles list

Jafarian, Rasul
Jafarian, Rasul